Ga is a letter of related and vertically oriented alphabets used to write Mongolic and Tungusic languages.

Mongolian language

Produced with  using the Windows Mongolian keyboard layout.
 In the Mongolian Unicode block,  comes after  and before .

Transliterated into Cyrillic with the letter .
 Dotted before a vowel (attached or separated); undotted before a consonant (syllable-final) or a whitespace.
 May turn silent between two adjacent vowels, and merge these into a long vowel or diphthong.  'Khagan' for instance, is read as Qaan unless reading classical literary Mongolian. Some exceptions like tsa-g-aan 'white' exist.
 Derived from Old Uyghur merged gimel and heth.

Transcribes Chakhar ; Khalkha . Transliterated into Cyrillic with the letter .
When it must be distinguished from  medially, it can be written twice (as in   'given', compared with   'dead').
 The final form is also found written like the bow-shaped Manchu final  .
 May turn silent between two adjacent vowels, and merge these into a long vowel or diphthong.  for instance, is read as deer. Some exceptions like  'no' exist.
 Derived from Old Uyghur kaph ).

Notes

References 

Articles containing Mongolian script text
Mongolic letters
Mongolic languages
Tungusic languages